Scopula bigeminata is a moth of the family Geometridae. It was described by entomologist William Warren in 1897. Scopula bigeminata ranges widely in Africa, including Angola, Cameroon, Ethiopia, Kenya, Malawi, South Africa, Sudan and Uganda.

References

Moths described in 1897
Moths of Africa
bigeminata
Taxa named by William Warren (entomologist)